Vlasta Redl  is a Czech folk musician.

Musical career
After playing at dance events in Valašské Meziříčí, Redl joined the Zlín band AG Flek, beginning his career as a folk singer. He then joined the group Fleret, which performed many of the songs he composed. In 1996 he formed his own group, Skupina která se jmenuje každý den jinak (The Band that has a different name every day).

Discography
2006 Vlasta Redl, Slávek Janoušek a Jaroslav Samson Lenk – Barvy domova
2004 Vlasta Redl a KDJ – Dopisy z květin
2000 Vlasta Redl – Pecky téměř všecky
1998 Vlasta Redl & Každý den jinak
1997 Vlasta Redl o kolo zpět
1995 Zuzana Homolová – Slovenské Balady
1995 Vlasta Redl, Slávek Janoušek a Jaroslav Samson Lenk – Kde domov můj
1995 AG Flek – Dohrála hudba + 1
1994 Vlasta Redl – AG Flek & Hradišťan – Jiří Pavlica
1993 Fleret – Secondhand za hubičku
1992 Vlasta Redl – Staré pecky
1991 AG Flek – Tramtárie
1990 Vlasta Redl – Na výletě
1990 Vlasta Redl, Slávek Janoušek a Jaroslav Samson Lenk – Zůstali jsme doma
1989 AG Flek – Dohrála hudba
1988 Slávek Janoušek – Kdo to zavinil
1987 Samson & Máci – Pohoda

References

1959 births
Living people
People from Nový Jičín
Czech folk musicians